Green Meadows is an unincorporated community in Wabash Township, Tippecanoe County, in the U.S. state of Indiana.

The community is part of the Lafayette, Indiana, Metropolitan Statistical Area.

History
In 1959, development began on a 102 acre plat bounded by Indiana Highway 26, Klondike Road, and Lindbergh Road. The development included a privately-owned sewage disposal system and central water system, one of the first subdivisions in the state to do so.

In 1990, the state started an investigation into malfeasance at the Green Meadows Utility company, and later that year stepped in to require improvements to the water service. In 1992 the water utility was acquired by West Lafayette Water company.

In the early 2000s, reports began to surface about cancer clusters in Green Meadows, pointing potential blame on hazardous waste dumped in landfills operated on the Purdue University Thomas Horticultural Farm, which was adjacent to the Green Meadows water source.

Geography

References

Unincorporated communities in Tippecanoe County, Indiana
Unincorporated communities in Indiana
Lafayette metropolitan area, Indiana